Cardinal Cushing College was a private, Catholic women's college in Brookline, Massachusetts.  It operated from 1952 to 1972 and was named after Cardinal Richard Cushing, who helped acquire the land for its campus while he was Archbishop of Boston.

Cardinal Cushing College was one of three now-defunct women's colleges sponsored by the Sisters of the Holy Cross, along with College of Saint Mary-of-the-Wasatch in Salt Lake City and Dunbarton College of Holy Cross in Washington, D.C.

The college's campus is now owned by Newbury College. Newbury College closed in 2019. Its records are held in the Sisters of the Holy Cross Archives at Saint Mary's College in Notre Dame, Indiana.

Defunct private universities and colleges in Massachusetts
Defunct Catholic universities and colleges in the United States
Educational institutions established in 1952
Educational institutions disestablished in 1972
Former women's universities and colleges in the United States
Catholic universities and colleges in Massachusetts
1952 establishments in Massachusetts
History of women in Massachusetts